Joseph Pappio (October 1, 1902 – August 22, 1971) was a member of the Chippewa. Pappio attended and played college football at the Haskell Indian Nations University.

He was a professional football player in the National Football League during the 1923 season. That season, he joined the NFL's Oorang Indians, a team based in LaRue, Ohio, composed only of Native Americans, and coached by Jim Thorpe. In 1924, Pappio played football for the Hominy Indians, an independent team from Hominy, Oklahoma, that too was composed entirely of Native Americans. In 1927 the Indians defeated the 1927 NFL champions, the New York Giants, 13–6. In 1930, Pappio returned to the NFL to play the 1930 season with the Chicago Cardinals.

References

Uniform Numbers of the NFL

Notes

1902 births
Native American players of American football
Players of American football from California
Chicago Cardinals players
Oorang Indians players
1971 deaths
Haskell Indian Nations University alumni
People from Hominy, Oklahoma